Gradec is a small village north of Pivka in the Inner Carniola region of Slovenia.

The local church in the settlement is dedicated to the Holy Trinity and belongs to the Parish of Pivka.

References

External links
Gradec on Geopedia

Populated places in the Municipality of Pivka